Richard Rogers is an American sound engineer. He won the Oscar for Best Sound for the film Platoon. He has worked on over 120 films since 1981.

Selected filmography
 Platoon (1986)

References

External links

Year of birth missing (living people)
Living people
American audio engineers
Place of birth missing (living people)
Best Sound Mixing Academy Award winners
Emmy Award winners